Andenes is a village in Nordland county, Norway.

Andenes may also refer to:

Places
Andenes (municipality), a former municipality in Nordland county, Norway
Andenes Church, a church in the village of Andenes, Norway
Andenes Lighthouse, a lighthouse in the village of Andenes, Norway
Andenes Knoll, a knoll in the Weddell Sea (part of the Southern Ocean)

Other uses
Andén (pl. andenes), a pre-Columbian agricultural terrace
K.V. Andenes, a Norwegian vessel

See also
Ardennes, region in Europe
Andén (disambiguation)